Pogonosoma maroccanum is a species of fly from the genus Pogonosoma. The species was originally described by Johan Christian Fabricius in 1794.

References

Laphriinae
Taxa named by Johan Christian Fabricius